"Forever" is the first single released from American singer-songwriter Kid Rock's fifth studio album, Cocky (2001), on October 23, 2001.

The song peaked at number 18 on the US Billboard Mainstream Rock chart and number 21 on the Billboard Modern Rock Tracks chart. Internationally, it reached number 27 in Australia, number 52 in Germany, and number 75 in Switzerland. "I'm a Dog," Cockys 10th track, was released along with "Forever" on the single. The music video, released in October 2001, features Pamela Anderson.

When the song is performed during concerts, the vocals are played over an instrumental version of "Tom Sawyer" by Rush.

Track listingsEuropean CD single "Forever" (radio edit)
 "Forever" (album version)Australian CD single "Forever" (radio edit) – 3:45
 "Forever" (explicit album version) – 3:45
 "I'm a Dog" (explicit album version) – 3:35

Credits and personnel
Credits are lifted from the European CD single liner notes.Studios Recorded at The Clarkston Chophouse (Clarkston, Michigan)
 Mixed at The Mix Room (Burbank, California)
 Mastered at Sterling Sound (New York City)Personnel'

 Kid Rock – writing (as R. J. Ritchie), lead vocals, backing vocals, production, mixing
 Uncle Kracker – writing (as Matthew Shafer), backing vocals
 Paradime – writing (as Freddie Beauregard), backing vocals
 Kenny Olson – lead guitar
 Jason Krause – metal guitar
 Jimmie Bones – organ

 Stefanie Eulinberg – drums
 Al Sutton – engineering, mixing
 Ted Jensen – mastering
 Larry Freemantle – art direction and design
 Clay McBride – photography

Charts

Release history

References

2001 singles
2001 songs
Atlantic Records singles
Kid Rock songs
Lava Records singles
Rap metal songs
Songs written by Kid Rock
Songs written by Uncle Kracker